Óscar Armando Jiménez Campos (born April 18, 1979, in Ilopango, El Salvador) is a retired Salvadoran professional footballer.

Club career
Jiménez started his career at Atlético Marte in 1998 and joined Second Division side Platense in 2003. He moved to Real San Martín, also in the second tier two years later, only to sign for Premier Division outfit Once Municipal in 2006. He kept switching clubs every year, playing for FAS and Alianza before ending up at Isidro Metapán.

International career
Jiménez received his first call up to the national team in January 2008. He officially got his first cap on January 22, 2008, in a friendly match against Belize and he has, as of June 2011, earned a total of 24 caps, scoring no goals. He has represented his country in 7 FIFA World Cup qualification matches and played at the 2009 UNCAF Nations Cup.

His final international was an August 2009 friendly match against Colombia.

References

External links
 

1979 births
Living people
People from San Salvador Department
Association football midfielders
Salvadoran footballers
El Salvador international footballers
2009 UNCAF Nations Cup players
2009 CONCACAF Gold Cup players
C.D. Atlético Marte footballers
Once Municipal footballers
C.D. FAS footballers
Alianza F.C. footballers
A.D. Isidro Metapán footballers
C.D. Luis Ángel Firpo footballers